The 1998–99 Coca-Cola Cup was a triangular ODI cricket competition held in Sharjah, United Arab Emirates from 7 to 16 April 1999. It featured the national cricket teams of England, Pakistan and India. Its official sponsor was Coca-Cola. The tournament was won by Pakistan, which defeated India in the final.

Squads

Points table

Group stage

1st ODI

2nd ODI

3rd ODI

4th ODI

5th ODI

6th ODI

Final

References

External links
 Tournament home at ESPN Cricinfo

1999 in English cricket
Cricket in the United Arab Emirates
1999 in Pakistani cricket
1999 in Indian cricket
One Day International cricket competitions
International cricket competitions from 1997–98 to 2000
1999 in Emirati cricket
1998 in Emirati cricket
Coca-Cola